Bad Romance (Alt. title: Les Mauvais Romans) is a mainland China 2011 independent drama film. Its English-language title was based on the song "Bad Romance", by singer-songwriter Lady Gaga. It was written and directed by first-time filmmaker François Chang, who has taken the essence of the song to create a story focussing on seven lonely individuals whose lives could be transformed after experiencing love at first sight.

The film premiered at the 27th Annual Boston LGBT Festival on 7 May 2011, and features male full-frontal nudity.

The director has subsequently directed two other films: Chifumi (2013) and The Forgiven (2015).

Plot
The story follows seven young men and women and their love lives: heterosexual, homosexual and bisexual, across the city of Beijing. A single mother meets a young student; a city boy meets a guy of his dream; a girl falls into a love game between a male and a female classmate from her French class.

Production
Bad Romance was filmed on location in Beijing, and was written, filmed and edited by debut Chinese filmmaker François Chang, with a largely unknown cast, an original music score combined with the popularly known music of singer/songwriter Lady Gaga, and a limited budget.

French language and culture feature prominently, with homage paid to Eric Rohmer's Six Contes Moraux, the music of Edith Piaf and the use of the Beijing Alliance Française as a location, setting the stage for a mixture of Asian and European culture and mores. The French singers are contrasted with Chinese opera where there is substantial variation in the timbre, tone and texture, but with similar messages. Photography and music are used to highlight the plot. The early-scene sun umbrella is intended to remind the viewer of Georges Seurat's "Sunday Afternoon on the Island of La Grande Jatte," while the minimalist string-rich score provides an accompaniment to the principal characters' contrasting lives.

Main cast
 Nranus Chen	 ... 	Xiao Ya
 Jason Lau	 ... 	Liu Cong
 Hayden Leung	 ... 	Liang Qing
 Will Bay	 ... 	Bei Si
 Chan Chan	 ... 	Yasmine
 François Chang ... 	François
 Macha Hsiao	 ... 	Loulou
 Xiaoguang Chen ... 	Male Lover / Neighbor
 Marie Robin	 ... 	Teacher
 Yeting Wen	 ... 	Kindergarten Teacher
 Hao Wu	 ... 	Bartender
 Jia Zhang	 ... 	Female Lover

See also
 List of Chinese films of 2011
 List of lesbian, gay, bisexual or transgender-related films
 List of lesbian, gay, bisexual, or transgender-related films by storyline
 Nudity in film (East Asian cinema since 1929)

References

External links

Bad Romance at Douban.com (Chinese language site)

2011 films
Films set in China
Chinese independent films
Chinese-language films
2011 drama films
Chinese LGBT-related films
LGBT-related drama films
2011 LGBT-related films
Films based on songs
Gay-related films
2010s Mandarin-language films